Jens Kristian Hansen (born 3 September 1971) is a former Faroese football defender or midfielder. He spent most of his career in B36 Tórshavn, while he also had spells with Freja Randers in Denmark, and Ayr United in Scotland. He has been capped for the Faroe Islands at senior level.

Club career
He started and played most of his career at Faroese club B36 and also played for Danish side Randers Freja and in Scotland for Ayr United, where he teamed up shortly alongside compatriot Jens Martin Knudsen.

International career
Hansen made his debut in a September 1994 European championship qualifying match against Greece. His final international match was the famous October 2002 1–2 loss against Germany in Hanover. He earned 44 caps, scoring three goals.

International goals
Scores and results list Faroe Islands' goal tally first.

References

External links
 

1971 births
Living people
Faroese footballers
Randers FC players
Ayr United F.C. players
B36 Tórshavn players
Faroe Islands international footballers
Faroese expatriate footballers
Expatriate men's footballers in Denmark
Expatriate footballers in Scotland
Scottish Football League players
Association football defenders